Knechtges is a surname. Notable people with the surname include:

Dan Knechtges, American director and choreographer
David R. Knechtges (born 1942), American sinologist
Eric Knechtges (born 1978), American composer